Hudson Ridge is a narrow rock ridge  long, lying  north of Heiser Ridge in the Neptune Range of the Pensacola Mountains, Antarctica. It was mapped by the United States Geological Survey from surveys and U.S. Navy air photos, 1956–66, and was named by  the Advisory Committee on Antarctic Names for Peter M. Hudson, an aviation machinist at Ellsworth Station, winter 1958.

References

Ridges of Queen Elizabeth Land